Alexander John Christie (born 28 September 1873; date of death unknown) was a Scottish football centre half who played in the Scottish League for Queen's Park and St Bernard's. He was capped by Scotland at international level.

Personal life 
Christie was the younger brother of international footballer Robert Christie.

References

External links

1873 births
Year of death missing
Scottish footballers
Scotland international footballers
Queen's Park F.C. players
Sportspeople from Dunblane
Place of death missing
Scottish Football League players
St Bernard's F.C. players
Association football wing halves
Footballers from Stirling (council area)